Donna M. Ryu is a United States magistrate judge of the United States District Court for the Northern District of California since 2010.

Education
Judge Ryu graduated with honors from Yale University in 1982, and received her Juris Doctor degree from University of California Berkeley School of Law in 1986.

Career

Law firm work
After graduating law school, Judge Ryu started her legal career as an Associate at the law firm of McCutchen, Doyle, Brown & Enersen in San Francisco, California. She worked there until 1988, when she joined the Oakland, California firm of Saperstein, Seligman, Mayeda & Larkin until 1992. In 1994, Judge Ryu founded the firm of Ryu, Dickey & Larkin in Oakland.

Academia
In 1998, Judge Ryu became an Associate Professor and the Associate Director of the Women's Employment Rights Clinic at Golden Gate University School of Law. In 2002, Judge Ryu became a Clinical Professor of Law at the University of California Hastings College of the Law, where she supervised and taught students at the Hastings Civil Justice Clinic. Her clinical coursework at both law schools included instruction on mediation, negotiation and trial techniques, as well as social security disability and employment law.

Judicial service
Judge Ryu was appointed on January 13, 2010, and began her term on March 1, 2010. She filled a position left open by then U.S. Magistrate Judge Richard Seeborg, who was nominated by President Barack Obama to serve as a U.S. District Judge.

She has served on various committees of the Northern District of California, including committees on Pro Bono Projects and Local Rules, and the Subcommittee on E-Discovery. Judge Ryu also presides over the Oakland Reentry Court.

Judge Ryu and Judge Kandis Westmore are also currently the only two U.S. Magistrate Judges serving in the Oakland Division of the Northern District of California.

Accolades
Among the honors and awards that Judge Ryu has received include a California Lawyer of the Year ("CLAY") Award for Employment Law, the Asian American Bar Association's Joe Morozumi Award for Exceptional Legal Advocacy, the Rutter Award for Excellence in Teaching (presented every year to the top professor at University of California Hastings College of the Law for teaching excellence), and the National Asian Pacific American Bar Association's Trailblazers Award. She has also been honored by the Hastings Public Interest Law Foundation, the California Employment Lawyers Association, and the Korean American Bar Association of Northern California.

Judge Ryu has also co-designed a national training institute on class action lawsuits, and has written and lectured extensively in the areas of employment law, pretrial practice, e-discovery, ethics & professionalism in lawyering and attorneys' fees, including presentations before the American Bar Association, the National Academy of Arbitrators, the California State Bar, and the Bar Association of San Francisco.

Judge Ryu is also the first Asian-American woman lawyer, first Korean American, and first lesbian to become a member of the Northern District of California.

Coalition on Homelessness v. City and County of San Francisco
On December 22, 2022, Judge Ryu held a hearing to determine whether to issue a preliminary injunction that would prevent the city government of San Francisco from forcibly relocating homeless people from the streets. Primarily at issue was the allegation that the city of San Francisco does not have sufficient beds available for the individuals displaced as a result of city sweeps of homeless encampments, which would potentially be in violation of the city of San Francisco's policies as well as the 8th amendment right protecting against cruel and unusual punishment. Also at issue was the claim that the city's practice of seizing homeless people's possessions violates the 4th amendment right against unreasonable searches and seizures and the 14th amendment right to due process and fair notice. Late the following day, December 23, 2022, Judge Ryu granted an emergency temporary injunction that prevents the city from proceeding in most cases with its relocation efforts.

See also
 List of Asian American jurists
 List of LGBT jurists in the United States

References

External links
The Honorable Donna M. Ryu, U.S. Magistrate Judge, United States District Court for the Northern District of California
Honorable Donna Ryu, Asian Pacific American Women Lawyers Alliance
Ballotpedia: Judge Donna Ryu

Living people
Yale University alumni
United States magistrate judges
People from Oakland, California
21st-century American judges
UC Berkeley School of Law alumni
Golden Gate University faculty
Year of birth missing (living people)
LGBT judges